Zacheus J. Maher, S.J. born in San Francisco was 17th president of Santa Clara University, Santa Clara, California, United States from 1921 to 1926,  after the presidency of Timothy L. Murphy and the 6th president of Loyola Marymount University, Los Angeles, California from 1930 to 1932.  After his tenure at Santa Clara and Loyola, he moved to the Vatican and became the assistant for North America to Wlodimir Ledóchowski, 26th Superior General of the Society of Jesus.

References

See also
Presidents of Loyola Marymount University

20th-century American Jesuits
Presidents of Santa Clara University
Presidents of Loyola Marymount University